Graphviz (short for Graph Visualization Software) is a package of open-source tools initiated by AT&T Labs Research for drawing graphs specified in DOT language scripts having the file name extension "gv". It also provides libraries for software applications to use the tools. Graphviz is free software licensed under the Eclipse Public License.

Tools 

 dot  a command-line tool to produce layered graph drawings in a variety of output formats, such as (PostScript, PDF, SVG, annotated text and so on).
 neato  useful for undirected graphs. "spring model" layout, minimizes global energy. Useful for graphs up to about 1000 nodes
 fdp  force-directed graph drawing similar to "spring model", but minimizes forces instead of energy. Useful for undirected graphs.
 sfdp  multiscale version of fdp for the layout of large undirected graphs
 twopi  for radial graph layouts. Nodes are placed on concentric circles depending their distance from a given root node
 circo  circular layout. Suitable for certain diagrams of multiple cyclic structures, such as certain telecommunications networks
 dotty  a graphical user interface to visualize and edit graphs.
 lefty  a programmable (in a language inspired by EZ) widget that displays DOT graphs and allows the user to perform actions on them with the mouse. Therefore, Lefty can be used as the view in a model–view–controller GUI application that uses graphs.
 gml2gv - gv2gml convert to/from GML, another graph file format.
 graphml2g convert a GraphML file to the DOT format.
 gxl2gv - gv2gxl convert to/from GXL, another graph file format.

Applications that use Graphviz 

Notable applications of Graphviz include:
 ArgoUML's alternative UML Diagram rendering called argouml-graphviz.
 AsciiDoc can embed Graphviz syntax as a diagram.
 Bison is able to output the grammar as dot for visualization of the language.
 ConnectedText has a Graphviz plugin.
 Doxygen uses Graphviz to generate diagrams, including class hierarchies and collaboration for source code.
 FreeCAD uses Graphviz to display the dependencies between objects in documents.
 Gephi has a Graphviz plugin.
 Gramps uses Graphviz to create genealogical (family tree) diagrams.
 Graph-tool a Python library for graph manipulation and visualization.
 OmniGraffle version 5 and later uses the Graphviz engine, with a limited set of commands, for automatically laying out graphs.
 Org-mode can work with DOT source code blocks.
 PlantUML uses Graphviz to generate UML diagrams from text descriptions.
 Puppet can produce DOT resource graphs that can be viewed with Graphviz.
 Scribus is an Open Source DTP program that can use Graphviz to render graphs by using its internal editor in a special frame type called render frame.
 Sphinx is a documentation generator that can use Graphviz to embed graphs in documents.
 TOra a free software database development and administration GUI, available under the GNU GPL.
 Trac wiki has a Graphviz plugin.
 Zim includes a plugin that allows adding and editing in-page diagrams using the Graphviz dot language.

See also 

 Graph drawing
 Graph theory
 Microsoft Automatic Graph Layout

References

External links
 
 graphviz on GitLab
 Graphviz, Projects & Software Page, AT&T Labs Research
 An Introduction to Graphviz and dot (M. Simionato, 2004)
 Create relationship diagrams with Graphviz (Shashank Sharma, 2005)  

Free diagramming software
Free software programmed in C
Graph drawing software
Software that uses Tk (software)
Software using the Eclipse license